The 1959 World Freestyle Wrestling Championship were held in Tehran, Iran.

Medal table

Team ranking

Medal summary

Men's freestyle

References
FILA Database

World Wrestling Championships
International wrestling competitions hosted by Iran
Sport in Tehran
World Wrestling Championships, 1959
1959 in sport wrestling